Acta Humana may refer to:
Acta Humana, journal published by Maria Curie-Skłodowska University
Acta Humana – Emberi Jogi Közlemények, journal published by the National University of Public Service